Saguiaran, officially the Municipality of Saguiaran (Maranao: Inged a Saguiaran), is a 4th class municipality in the province of Lanao del Sur, Philippines. According to the 2020 census, it has a population of 26,712 people.

It is home to NPC Agus II Hydro Power Plant.

Geography
It is about 7 kilometers from Marawi City's KM 000. One can reach Saguiaran either via road transport from Iligan City via jeepney or public utility vehicle going to Marawi City.

Barangays
Saguiaran is politically subdivided into 30 barangays.

Climate

Demographics

Almost all people residing in Saguiaran are Maranao with only minority from other tribes usually Maguindanaon, Bisaya, and Subanon who are working as house-help and other available jobs. Some people of Saguiaran, particularly those from the Barangays along the national highway such as Barangay Batangan, Poblacion and Mipaga, trace their roots from the Royal Sultanate of Marawi or the Buadi Sacayo. The most notable clans are the Amaikurot of Maitu Basak, the Bracan and Dimacaling from Lima Ka Agama.

Economy

The main form of livelihood is agriculture. However, through the influx of businessmen from Marawi City, establishments such as gasoline stations, hardware and construction materials shops, tailoring shops, glassware shops, pharmacies, groceries, Maranaw and Middle Eastern restaurants and coffee shops are visible through out the main thorough fare. The most popular among the restaurants is the Norhaya Local Restaurant which is patronized by the locals all across Lanao passing by Saguiaran. Also, among the coffee lovers, they flock to Black Scoop Cafe located in Poblacion. Among Sinarikit village residents in Poblacion, they rely with Sinarikit Pharmacy and Mini Mart for a one stop shop needs.

Tourism
Pantuwaraya Lake National Park is a  park comprising Lake Pantao Raya and surrounding area. It was declared a national park in 1965.

Tourists can visit the Basak Lake located at Barangay Maito Basak. Another tourists attraction is the Buwalan Mosque, considered the oldest Mosque in Saguiaran, is situated above tiny hills where in nearby spring provides potable water to people of Saguiaran and nearby Marawi City. This spring has many outlets but the notable one is the one being used by the public as water supply.

Tourists may buy special Browa, a Maranao delicacy, at Tata Bakeshoppe along the National Highway fronting the Municipal Hall. The taste has made this Browa special than other Browa made from Marawi City. The provincial welcome arch is located at Saguiaran, which is notable for its Islamic influence.

Bualan Mosque, is considered the oldest mosque in Saguiaran.

Pantar Bridge is a half-century-old American-built truss bridge. Overseen from the bridge is the water reservoir of National Power Corporation and the welcome arch of the province of Lanao del Sur.

Education
There are a few of the public and private schools in Saguiaran:
Mindanao State University - Saguiaran Community High school, is considered the best Mindanao State University External Units High School (2003-2017) and was one of the most reputable public high schools in Lanao del Sur.
Saguiaran National High School
M & S Maito Basak National High School
Sampal Memorial National High School
Saguiaran Central Elementary School
Bubong Elementary School
Batangan Elementary School
Philippine Integrated School – Saguiaran Branch
Al-Malik Child Learning Center

References

External links
 Saguiaran Profile at the DTI Cities and Municipalities Competitive Index
 [ Philippine Standard Geographic Code]
Philippine Census Information
Local Governance Performance Management System

Municipalities of Lanao del Sur